Sharisse Jackson (born August 31, 1976) is an American actress and singer, best known for playing Niecy Jackson on the UPN sitcom Moesha. She was crowned the winner of MTV reality show Celebrity Rap Superstar in 2007.

Early life
Jackson was born in Boston, Massachusetts. Her mother is of mixed African American and Puerto Rican descent.

Acting
Jackson played the titular character's best friend, Niecy Jackson, on the TV show Moesha. She has also appeared in  The Parkers, The Bernie Mac Show, and My So-Called Life as Crystal. She co-starred in the Nickelodeon movie Good Burger with Kel Mitchell and Kenan Thompson. Jackson was also featured on the ABC reality series The Ex-Wives Club  with Marla Maples and Angie Everhart. The show is aimed to support men and women who have recently gone through separation or divorce. In 2009, Jackson appeared in the film I Do... I Did!. She also appeared in the dance-oriented film Steppin: The Movie.

She also appeared on the seventh season of Celebrity Fit Club: Boot Camp, which premiered in February 2010.

Music career
Jackson was a member in the short-lived pop girl group Mpulz and was included on The Princess Diaries soundtrack. The group released only one single before disbanding in 2002.

Personal life
Jackson was engaged to Kevin Federline, with whom she has a daughter and a son. The couple separated shortly before their son's birth, instigated by Federline's relationship with pop singer Britney Spears. Jackson later commented that Federline's relationship with Spears "wasn't like just breaking up a relationship. It was like breaking up a family", but sustained an amicable relationship with Federline, complimenting his parenting. Through her daughter Cassalei and her partner Christopher Massey, she has a granddaughter.

She has two other children, a son and a daughter, with her high-school ex-boyfriend.

Filmography

Film

Television

References

External links 

 

1976 births
20th-century American actresses
21st-century American actresses
Actresses from Boston
African-American actresses
American actresses of Puerto Rican descent
American film actresses
American actresses of Mexican descent
American people who self-identify as being of Native American descent
American television actresses
Hispanic and Latino American actresses
Living people
Musicians from Massachusetts
Native American people from Massachusetts
Participants in American reality television series
African-American women musicians
20th-century African-American women
20th-century African-American people
21st-century African-American women
21st-century African-American people